Avalon is the original soundtrack of the 1990 film Avalon starring Armin Mueller-Stahl, Elizabeth Perkins, Kevin Pollak and Elijah Wood. The original score was composed by Randy Newman.

The score was nominated for 3 awards:
Academy Award (lost to the score of Dances with Wolves),
Golden Globe (lost to the score of The Sheltering Sky),
Grammy Award (lost to the score of Dances with Wolves).

Track listing 
 1914  
 Weekend Musicians  
 Avalon/Moving Day  
 Jules & Michael  
 Television, Television, Television  
 Circus  
 Wedding  
 The Family  
 The Fire  
 No More Television  
 Funeral  
 End Titles

External links
Soundtrack.net link

Drama film soundtracks
1990 soundtrack albums
Albums arranged by Randy Newman
Albums conducted by Randy Newman
Randy Newman soundtracks